"A Better Love Next Time" is a song written by Johnny Christopher and Bobby Wood, and recorded by American country music artist Merle Haggard backed by The Strangers.  It was released in July 1989 as the second single from the album 5:01 Blues.  The song reached number 4 on the Billboard Hot Country Singles & Tracks chart. It was Haggard's last Top Ten hit. It was co-produced by Mark Yeary, keyboardist of The Strangers.

Personnel
Merle Haggard– vocals, guitar

The Strangers:
Norm Hamlet – pedal steel guitar
Clint Strong – guitar
Bobby Wayne – guitar
Mark Yeary – hammond organ, piano, electric piano
Jimmy Belkin – fiddle, strings
Biff Adams – drums
Don Markham – saxophone, trumpet
Gary Church – cornet, trombone

Chart performance

Year-end charts

References

1989 singles
Merle Haggard songs
Epic Records singles
1989 songs
Songs written by Johnny Christopher
Songs written by Bobby Wood (songwriter)